Mission to Mars is a 2000 American science fiction adventure film directed by Brian De Palma, written by Jim Thomas, John Thomas, and Graham Yost, and suggested by Disney's theme park attraction of the same name. The film depicts the first crewed Mars exploration mission going awry; American astronaut Jim McConnell (Gary Sinise) helps to coordinate a rescue mission for a colleague. Principal support actors were Tim Robbins, Don Cheadle, Connie Nielsen, Jerry O'Connell, and Kim Delaney.

Plot
In 2020, the Mars I mission launches for planet Mars, commanded by Luke Graham (Don Cheadle). Upon arrival, the team discovers a bright white formation in the Cydonia region, which they suspect is an extrusion from a subsurface geothermal column of water, useful to future human colonization. After reporting this to the Earth-orbiting World Space Station, they go to investigate the formation and start hearing a low sound on their communications system. Radar initially reports that the formation is metal, but when they increase power to the radar, a large vortex appears and kills everyone except Luke. After the vortex subsides, the formation is revealed to be part of a large humanoid face.

The event creates an electromagnetic pulse the space station observes, after which it receives a distress message from Luke. Realizing Luke couldn't have left because the pulse would have damaged the computer system of the ERV ("Earth Return Vehicle"), they repurpose the Mars II mission into a rescue.

Months later, as Mars Rescue, consisting of Commander Woody Blake (Tim Robbins), his wife Terri Fisher (Connie Nielsen), recent widower Jim McConnell (Gary Sinise), and technician Phil Ohlmyer (Jerry O'Connell), nears Mars orbit, they discover that all satellite imagery of the formation area is covered with static. Micrometeoroids breach the ship, causing damage to the external fuel lines and resulting in the engines exploding. With the destroyed Mars II out of control,  crew are forced to abandon ship and travel in their spacesuits to the REMO ("Resupply Module") in a nearby orbit over Mars. Woody launches himself at the module and manages to attach a tether to it, but loses his grip and begins descending into the Martian atmosphere. Terri attempts to rescue Woody, but knowing she would run out of fuel before reaching him, Woody removes his helmet, killing himself to save her.

The survivors arrive on the Martian surface, and begin repairing the ERV. They find Luke living in a greenhouse; he shows them pictures of the face, and reveals that the pulses in the low sound they heard represented a 3D model of human-like DNA, but missing a pair of chromosomes. Jim determines they must complete the sequence to pass a test, and they send a rover to broadcast the completed signal via radar. Following the transmission, an opening appears in the side of the structure. With a massive dust storm approaching Jim, Terri, and Luke head to the formation, while Phil stays to finish repairing the ERV. Phil is ordered to launch, with or without them, before the storm hits.

The three astronauts enter the opening, which seals behind them. A three-dimensional projection of the solar system depicts the planet Mars, covered with water, being struck by a large asteroid and rendered uninhabitable. A projection of a humanoid Martian lifeform reveals that the native Martians evacuated the planet in spaceships, one of which was sent to seed Earth with DNA, intending to create life that could one day land on Mars and be recognized as descendants. An invitation is offered for one of their group to follow the Martians to their new home. Jim accepts the invitation, bidding farewell to Terri and Luke, and is sealed inside a small capsule. Terri and Luke race back to the ERV and arrive just as Phil is about to take off. They barely escape the dust storm into space as Jim's capsule is launched from the crumbling formation and past them toward the Martians' home.

Cast
 Gary Sinise as Jim McConnell
 Tim Robbins as Woody Blake
 Don Cheadle as Luke Graham
 Connie Nielsen as Terri Fisher
 Jerry O'Connell as Phil Ohlmyer
 Kim Delaney as Maggie McConnell
 Peter Outerbridge as Sergei Kirov
 Kavan Smith as Nicholas Willis
 Jill Teed as Renée Coté
 Elise Neal as Debra Graham
 Robert Bailey Jr. as Bobby Graham
 Taylor Jones as Daniel Lederman
 Armin Mueller-Stahl as Ray Beck
 Bill Timoney as Computer (voice)

Filming
The film was shot primarily on location in Vancouver, British Columbia; Jordan; and the Canary Islands. Extensive special effects surrounding certain aspects of the film such as the NASA spacecraft and Martian vortex, were created by a number of digital effects companies including ILM, Dream Quest Images, Tippett Studio, CIS Hollywood, and Trans FX. Between visuals, miniatures, and animation, over 400 technicians were directly involved in the production aspects of the special effects.

According to the director in the 2015 documentary film about his career, De Palma was brought on board after the previous director walked away due to concerns over the lack of additional money for the budget. De Palma indicated that the film needed additional funds and that much of the budget went into the CGI for the film. When De Palma was hired the script had already been written and the film cast.

Soundtrack

The original score for Mission to Mars, was released by the Hollywood Records music label on March 14, 2000. The score for the film was composed by Ennio Morricone and performed by the New York Philharmonic. Suzana Peric and Nick Meyers edited the film's music.

Reception

Release
The film, produced by Disney's Touchstone Pictures, was distributed by Buena Vista Pictures in North America, and Spyglass Entertainment in selected European territories. Mission to Mars explores astronomy, extraterrestrial life, and space exploration. Despite the fact that the film employed the use of numerous extensive special effects, it failed to garner any award nominations from mainstream motion picture organizations for its production merits. On March 14, 2000, the original film score was released by the Hollywood Records label. It was composed, orchestrated, and conducted by Italian composer Ennio Morricone.

Critical response
Among mainstream critics in the U.S., the film received mainly negative reviews. Rotten Tomatoes reported that 25% of 110 sampled critics gave the film a positive review, with an average score of 4.1/10 and the consensus, "Beauty only goes skin deep in this shallow but visually stunning film." At Metacritic, which assigns a weighted average out of 100 to critics' reviews, the film received a score of 34 based on 36 reviews. Furthermore, the film was nominated for a Golden Raspberry Award for Brian De Palma in the category of 'Worst Director', where he lost to Roger Christian for Battlefield Earth. Audiences surveyed by CinemaScore gave the film a grade "C−" on scale of A to F. On the Taste of Cinema website, David Harkin felt that Mission to Mars was an "enjoyable slice of sci-fi, with [director De Palma's] trademark mix of stylish camera movements and visual flourishes".

The film's reception among French-language critics was markedly different in positive fashion. Film journal Cahiers du cinéma devoted several articles to De Palma and Mission to Mars at the time of its release, and placed it as #4 in their list of the 10 best films of 2000. The film was screened out of competition at the 2000 Cannes Film Festival.

—Bob Graham, writing in the San Francisco Chronicle

Mark Halverson, writing in Sacramento News & Review, said "My inner child felt cheated that the film leapt from an astronaut barbecue to Mars without so much as a rocket launch and that the best special effect (a sandstorm nod to The Mummy) was unveiled in the first 20 minutes." He added, "This visually alluring mess also includes gobs of cheesy dialogue and a hokey-looking alien." Left unimpressed, Bob Graham in the San Francisco Chronicle, wrote that the film "meanders into space-mystico mumbo jumbo. We're supposed to share the characters' awe at the wonder of the universe, but more likely the audience will wonder whatever were the filmmakers thinking." Graham characterized Mission to Mars as "a very mixed bag: rhapsodic cinematography, several genuine shocks amid a suffocating air of gooeyness, impressive visual effects – even if some seem to exist in a vacuum – and an absolutely loony conclusion." Roger Ebert of the Chicago Sun-Times, said the film "contains conversations that drag on beyond all reason. It is quiet when quiet is not called for. It contains actions that deny common sense. And for long stretches the characters speak nothing but boilerplate". He believed that "It misses too many of its marks. But it has extraordinary things in it. It's as if the director, the gifted Brian De Palma, rises to the occasions but the screenplay gives him nothing much to do in between them." The film however, was not without its supporters. Michael Wilmington of the NY Daily News, exclaimed the film was "One of the most gorgeous science-fiction movies ever - and probably also one of the most realistic in detail and scientific extrapolation". Richard Corliss of TIME commented that "This isn't 2001, by a long shot, but for 2000, it'll do nicely". William Arnold of the Seattle Post-Intelligencer, added to the positive sentiment by saying "Here and there an inspired shot makes the film come alive, and at least three of its sequences had me positioned well on the edge of my seat."

Writing for The Austin Chronicle, Marc Savlov noted that the "Mission to Mars falls prey to an overwhelming sense of a man trying to please everyone all the time." He went further, that "De Palma has reached out to embrace a larger audience and seemingly sacrificed those traits that drew us to him in the first place: his singular vision, his clinical stylistics, and the palpable sense of dread that his best films engender." In a mixed review, James Berardinelli writing for ReelViews, called the film "Ineptly directed, badly acted, and scripted with an eye towards stupidity and incoherence, the film is worthwhile only to those who are in desperate need of a nap. And, as is often the case when a big budget, high profile motion picture self-destructs, this one does so in spectacular fashion." Describing a mixed opinion, J. Hoberman of The Village Voice said the film encompassed "a touchy-feely esprit that's predicated on equal parts Buck Rogers bravado and backyard barbecue, the whole burnt burger drenched in Ennio Morricone's elegiac western-style score".

—Margaret A. McGurk, writing for The Cincinnati Enquirer

Elvis Mitchell of The New York Times, stated that the "visual design is spectacular, and the scenes on the Martian surface look so real that the picture could have been made on location. A holographic sequence detailing the evolutionary link between Earth and Mars is staggeringly well staged." However, he ultimately came to the conclusion that there wasn't "an original moment in the entire movie, and the score is so repetitive that it could have been downloaded directly from EnnioMorricone.com." Similarly, Todd McCarthy wrote in Variety that the film's "dramatic package that it arrives in is so flimsy, unconvincing and poorly wrought that it's impossible to be swept away by the illustrated version of creationism on offer." He did note "Pictorially, the film is smooth and pristine looking. De Palma and his frequent cinematographer Stephen H. Burum go for their patented swooping and twisting camera moves whenever possible, and there are some very nice ones onboard the recovery ship." Lisa Schwarzbaum writing for Entertainment Weekly deduced that "Mission to Mars wants us to think about lofty things: the bravery of explorers, the ingenuity of our nation's space program, the humility required to comprehend the possibility that we earthlings are not the be-all and end-all of creation. But De Palma's film is too embarrassed, too jittery and self-conscious to hush up and pay attention."

Box office
The film premiered in cinemas on March 10, 2000, in wide release throughout the U.S. During its opening weekend, the film opened in first place grossing $22,855,247 in business showing at 3,054 locations. The film The Ninth Gate came in second place during that weekend grossing $6,622,518. The film's revenue dropped by 50% in its second week of release, earning $11,385,709. For that particular weekend, the film fell to second place screening in 3,060 theaters. Erin Brockovich unseated Mission to Mars to open in first place grossing $28,138,465 in box office revenue. During its final weekend in release, it opened in a distant 72nd place with $17,467 in revenue. The film went on to top out domestically at $60,883,407 in total ticket sales through an 18-week theatrical run. The film took in an additional $50,100,000 in business through international release to top out at a combined $110,983,407 in gross revenue. The film ranked 41st at the box office for 2000.

Home media
Mission on Mars was released on VHS and DVD on September 12, 2000. The film was later released on Blu-ray in France on September 22, 2009.

See also
 List of films set on Mars
 List of films featuring space stations
 List of films featuring extraterrestrials
 Mars in fiction

References

Bibliography

External links

 
 
 
 
 
 
 
 

2000 films
2000s American films
2000s English-language films
2000 science fiction action films
American science fiction action films
American space adventure films
Films about ancient astronauts
Films about astronauts
Films based on amusement park attractions
Films directed by Brian De Palma
Films set in 2020
Films set in 2021
Films shot in Vancouver
Films scored by Ennio Morricone
Films set in Texas
Films with screenplays by Jim Thomas (screenwriter)
Films with screenplays by John Thomas (screenwriter)
Mars in film
Spyglass Entertainment films
Touchstone Pictures films
UFO-related films